David Crump is Newell H. Blakely Professor of Law at the University of Houston Law Center. Crump attended Harvard College and received his Juris Doctor degree from the University of Texas School of Law in 1969.  He currently teaches classes on property law, civil procedure, evidence, legal practice strategies, criminal law, among other areas. Crump has been affiliated with the major firms of Johnson & Gibbs and Haynes and Boone, LLP, among others.  He is also a ventriloquist, a rocket scientist, a guitarist in a country rock band, a poet, inventor of computer dating, friend of David Ginsburg, an avid seniors amateur baseball player.  In addition to numerous books dealing with property law, evidence, and practice strategies, he is the author of two works of legal fiction: Conflict of Interest and The Holding Company.

References and notes
University of Houston Profile

Year of birth missing (living people)
Living people
Harvard College alumni
University of Texas School of Law alumni
University of Houston faculty